Pioneer Township is a civil township of Missaukee County in the U.S. state of Michigan. The population was 451 at the 2010 census.

Communities 
In the 1920s, Pioneer was on the route of M-74.

Geography

Demographics
As of the census of 2000, there were 460 people, 184 households, and 138 families residing in the township.  The population density was 12.8 per square mile (4.9/km).  There were 346 housing units at an average density of 9.6 per square mile (3.7/km).  The racial makeup of the township was 97.39% White, 0.65% Native American, 0.22% Asian, 0.22% from other races, and 1.52% from two or more races. Hispanic or Latino of any race were 0.87% of the population.

There were 184 households, out of which 29.9% had children under the age of 18 living with them, 65.8% were married couples living together, 4.3% had a female householder with no husband present, and 25.0% were non-families. 19.0% of all households were made up of individuals, and 9.2% had someone living alone who was 65 years of age or older.  The average household size was 2.49 and the average family size was 2.81.

In the township the population was spread out, with 22.0% under the age of 18, 6.3% from 18 to 24, 25.0% from 25 to 44, 35.0% from 45 to 64, and 11.7% who were 65 years of age or older.  The median age was 43 years. For every 100 females, there were 110.0 males.  For every 100 females age 18 and over, there were 113.7 males.

The median income for a household in the township was $32,000, and the median income for a family was $35,833. Males had a median income of $33,750 versus $20,125 for females. The per capita income for the township was $16,837.  About 7.8% of families and 8.9% of the population were below the poverty line, including 4.9% of those under age 18 and 14.0% of those age 65 or over.

References 

Townships in Missaukee County, Michigan
Townships in Michigan
Populated places established in 1906
1906 establishments in Michigan